Mayan Americans are Americans of Indigenous Mayan descent. Most Mayan Americans originate from western Guatemala and Chiapas.

Guatemalan civil war and reasons for migration 

The Cold War led to the spread of Communist ideology in Latin America. The influence of Fidel Castro and the Cuban Revolution led to an uprising from the Guatemalan working class, indigenous Mayans and peasant Ladino workers. These groups began forming left-wing factions and guerrilla groups like the MR-13, Guatemalan Party of Labor, and the EGP. This armed conflict was a result of a coup d'etat supported by the CIA against the democratically elected government of Jacobo Árbenz in 1954. The Mayan population of Guatemala found themselves caught in the crossfires of the Guatemalan Civil War from 1954-1996. During this time period, food shortages, political oppression, and violence led to the death of over 200,000 Guatemalan Mayans. To combat Communist guerilla groups, the Guatemalan military issued the policy of Tierras Arrasadas, essentially a scorched earth policy. The Guatemalan military raided areas suspected of revolutionary actions. The military burned the peasant villages and all their crops. This led to famine and harsh economic conditions in the widely Mayan peasant class. The Guatemalan government was run by a series of puppet dictators during the conflict. With U.S support and funding, the regime attempted maintain order by repressing the Mayans in rural areas. The government-funded repression and massacre of ethnic Mayans in Guatemala during the Civil War along with leftist-guerilla interaction with indigenous peasants led to waves of Mayans emigrating to avoid military persecution. This political instability, lack of opportunity, and natural disasters all served to catalyze Mayan migration.

Post-war migration 

The socioeconomic conditions of war eventually triggered a mass migration of Mayans into America in 1970. This migration lasted until the end of the Guatemalan Civil War. The three waves of Mayan refugees consisted of the initial refugee wave, the Family Reunification wave and the Economic Adventurer wave. Many Mayan families were split up because the males of the household would move to America and remit money back home to Guatemala. The number of Mayan migrants rapidly increased until the 21st century. However, during the war, Mayan migration spiked because the conditions became too much for the families of already emigrated immigrants. As the war continued, immigration laws in the U.S began to interfere with asylum seekers. The Reagan administration proved to be very particular on who was granted asylum in the United States. Other problems stemmed from leaving the family unit and the documentation process for immigrants. The Guatemalan Civil War was at its peak during the Reagan presidency and due to his anti-communist doctrine, the administration rarely considered Guatemalan refugees for asylum since the doctrine refused economic refugees from Communist countries. Although the war was the reason for migration during the 1970s, it was difficult for Mayans to be granted asylum. The post-civil war migrants are mostly economic migrants. Today, more Mayans are arriving to America from Guatemala for better economic conditions. Mayans also migrated to other Central American countries like Mexico, but a large amount migrated to the United States. Today, Mayans have settled in places like San Francisco, Miami, and the Great Plains.

The Maya in North America 

Mayan-Americans are mostly found along the Sunbelt. They inhabit many urban cities like Los Angeles and Houston but they also occupy rural areas due to their agricultural roots. Many Mayan migrants moved to poor neighborhoods in big cities which led to even more violence, resource shortages, and racial oppression. Most of the Mayan immigrants are labor migrants therefore, they occupy a number of manual-labor positions. Also, migrant Mayans deal with problems in communication and contacting relatives. The postal service in Guatemala is unreliable so many of Mayan Americans must use special courier services to contact relatives. The United States Postal service only forwards mail to the Guatemala postal service. Therefore, Many Mayan-Americans do not use it. Settlements in places like Nebraska are home to large meatpacking factories that hire migrant Mayans but pay them low-wages. Although some Mayans were placed in crowded urban areas, they still own businesses such as restaurants, culture classes, and other sources of revenue. The communal aspect of Mayan society is very strong as more majority Mayan populations start to occupy more U.S land and form their own means of sustenance for those economies. Other ethnic Mayans formed settlements in agricultural societies like Indiantown, Florida. Indiantown is located in Martin County, Florida, and has a growing Latin American population. Most of this population consists of displaced indigenous people with roots in Central America. Certain areas have larger Mayan populations than others. Still, there are harsh economic conditions and less mobility due to language barriers and forced assimilation. The agricultural and communal background of Mayans confines a large percentage of them to their communities. The generational gap of Mayan migrants also shows the transition from different perspectives as we see third-generation migrants began to succeed in the factory setting rather than the rural settings. Although a large percent of Mayan Americans still do farm, a large number of them are in more industrial settings. Factory life has been a staple in Mayan Society in the United States. Mayan presence in the workforce is prevalent in many areas. Industrial work, farm labor, and leadership roles are all things that Mayans help contribute to the U.S economy.

Culture 

The conditions that influenced the waves of Guatemalan migration caused for the forced migration of the Mayan people. Some Mayans would consider themselves as displaced refugees who have a hard time of assimilating into the American culture. The process of forced assimilation leads to Mayans forming more exclusive migrant communities on U.S soil. The cultural transition is far too complicated to make for some migrants. Another problem facing Mayan Americans is distinction and categorization. Mayan dialect is different from regular Spanish and this leads to more problems in schools, work, and recreational life for Mayan Americans.  The Mayans speak a large range of dialects and languages. Some speak Spanish and others speak Mam, Yucatec, Kekchi, or another language. Processing of their immigration papers is more difficult due to the specificity of their cultural distinction. The immigration system largely lumps Mayans with other Latin Americans rather than recognizing their ethnic distinctiveness. Identity issues for Mayan Americans have always been a barrier for ethnic Mayans. In relative terms, Guatemalans immigrants are a small proportion of Latin American immigrants in the US so their identity in America is relatively unknown compared to other racial groups and ethnicities. Traditional village and family structures are still prevalent among Mayans in the United States. This sometimes proves to be problematic in Mayan communities and especially in the workplace. These hierarchal systems put in place are oftentimes challenged by the separate hierarchies of workplaces. Their indigenous roots prove to be strong because most Mayan Americans live in Mayan communities. Outside of their communities, there is a big cultural sphere of influence in places where Mayans sought refuge. In Los Angeles, The Mayan Theater was once seen as a revival of Mayan architecture and art. In the 1990s, the theater was deemed a historical monument. Mayan culture is still being used for financial gain in many other areas. The Maya Lagoon is a lucrative night club located in Houston.

References

American people of indigenous peoples descent
Native American people by tribe
 
 
People of Maya descent